Megali Gefyra is a village of the Pydna-Kolindros municipality. Before the 2011 local government reform it is part of the municipality of Aiginio. The 2011 census recorded 192 residents in the village.

See also
 List of settlements in the Pieria regional unit

References

Populated places in Pieria (regional unit)